The 17th Virginia Cavalry Regiment was a cavalry regiment raised in Virginia for service in the Confederate States Army during the American Civil War. It fought with the Army of Northern Virginia, in southwestern Virginia, and in the Shenandoah Valley.

Virginia's 17th Cavalry Regiment was organized at Salem, Virginia, on January 28, 1863, by consolidating the 33rd Battalion Virginia Cavalry with three new companies. The men were recruited primarily in the counties that became West Virginia; Mercer, Nicholas, Jackson, Braxton, Wood, Lewis, Harrison, Roane, Wirt, Pocahontas, Monroe, and Giles County, Virginia.

They were first sent to southwestern Virginia and adjoining areas of Tennessee and later assigned to Jenkins' and McCausland's Brigade. They were active in the Gettysburg Campaign, then returned to western Virginia. The regiment fought at Cloyd's Mountain, was with Early in the Shenandoah Valley, and saw action around Appomattox.

There were 241 engaged at Gettysburg and during February, 1864, it contained 311 effectives. In April, 1865, it disbanded at Lynchburg. The field officers were Colonel William H. French, Lieutenant Colonel William C. Tavenner, and Major Frederick F. Smith.

See also

List of Virginia Civil War units
List of West Virginia Civil War Confederate units

References

Units and formations of the Confederate States Army from Virginia
1863 establishments in Virginia
Military units and formations established in 1863
1865 disestablishments in Virginia
Military units and formations disestablished in 1865